The title Countess of Salisbury may be carried by a female heir of the Earl of Salisbury or to the wife of an Earl of Salisbury. The title has been held by several women, including:

Countesses in their own right
 Ela of Salisbury, 3rd Countess of Salisbury  (1187–1261), heiress to William of Salisbury, 2nd Earl of Salisbury
 Margaret Longespée, 4th Countess of Salisbury (d. 1310), heiress to Ela Longespee
 Alice de Lacy, 5th Countess of Salisbury (1281–1348), heiress to Margaret Longespee; forfeit 1322
 Alice Montacute, 5th Countess of Salisbury (1407–1462), heiress to Thomas Montagu, 4th Earl of Salisbury
 Margaret Pole, Countess of Salisbury (1473-1541), heiress to George, Duke of Clarence

Countesses by marriage
Catherine Montacute, Countess of Salisbury (1304-1349), married William Montagu, 1st Earl of Salisbury
Joan of Kent (1326-1385), married William Montagu, 2nd Earl of Salisbury (annulled 1349)
Maud Montacute, Countess of Salisbury (1370-1424), married John Montagu, 3rd Earl of Salisbury
Catherine Cecil, Countess of Salisbury (c.1590-1673), married William Cecil, 2nd Earl of Salisbury
Margaret Cecil, Countess of Salisbury (died c.1682), married James Cecil, 3rd Earl of Salisbury
Anne Cecil, Countess of Salisbury (1693-1757), married James Cecil, 5th Earl of Salisbury
Emily Cecil, Marchioness of Salisbury (1750-1835), married James Cecil, 7th Earl and later 1st Marquess of Salisbury)